Partick (Scottish Gaelic: Partaig) is an area of Glasgow on the north bank of the River Clyde, just across from Govan. To the west lies Whiteinch, to the east Yorkhill and Kelvingrove Park (across the River Kelvin), and to the north Broomhill, Hyndland, Dowanhill, Hillhead, areas which form part of the West End of Glasgow. Partick was a Police burgh from 1852 until 1912 when it was incorporated into the city. Partick is the area of the city most connected with the Highlands, and several Gaelic agencies, such as the Gaelic Books Council (Scottish Gaelic: Comhairle nan Leabhraichean) are located in the area. Some ATMs in the area display Gaelic.

Etymology
The modern name derives from the ancient Cumbric Peartoc (as in the modern Welsh word perth, meaning "bush or thicket").

This was adopted into Scottish Gaelic as Peart(h)aig, giving modern Gaelic Pearraig or Partaig (the latter is used on signs at Partick railway station). Older anglicised forms include Perdyc and Perthick. Partick, of old Perdyec, from the Gaelic aper dhu ec, meaning the place at the confluence or mouth of the dark river.

History

Although Partick remained a village until the middle of the 18th century, it is an ancient place. The Kings of Strathclyde had a residence there, and in 1136 David I (1124–53) granted the lands of Perdyc to the see of Glasgow. The Bishops of Glasgow had a country seat in Partick. It was later the site of Partick Castle, a country home of George Hutcheson (demolished 1836). The burgh, which had its headquarters at Partick Burgh Hall, was annexed by Glasgow in 1912.

Areas
It is historically divided into three social areas; south of Dumbarton Road, north of Dumbarton Road and the Partick Hill grand villas.  Being within the sphere of influence of the University of Glasgow and neighbouring Glasgow's salubrious "West End" it has a high student population.  Traditional industries for the area were shipbuilding and the huge Meadowside Granary (recently demolished to make way for the new Glasgow Harbour residential development) employed many residents also. The main street in Partick, Dumbarton Road, has a number of services for residents to use.

Community
Partick Burgh Hall is a venue (much like a community centre) located within Partick. It regularly holds community events and is owned and managed by Culture & Sport Glasgow (part of Glasgow City Council). The hall was originally built in 1872 and has multiple rooms. The hall is staffed in order to accommodate events and to handle security. Private events are also held in the hall.

Partick Community Council is an organization which exists in the area to deal with issues within the community. It is the oldest community group in Partick and consists of around twenty elected members. The boundary of this council runs from Byres Road to Crow Road and from the River Clyde to Highburgh Road. The council is funded by Glasgow City Council by way of an annual grant.

Examples of activities of the Community Council include:
Neighbourhood Watch coordination.
Lobbying of Glasgow City Council
Promoting cleanliness and security in the area

Sport

Partick is home to the West of Scotland Cricket Club's Hamilton Crescent ground, which was the site of the first ever international football match (between Scotland and England) on 30 November 1872.

Partick Thistle Football Club were formed in the area in 1876, but left to play in the Maryhill area of Glasgow in 1909. Partick were also active in the 1870s and 1880s.

Transport
Partick station is a trunk station serving as an interchange between the local rail, Glasgow Subway and local bus systems. It replaced the former Partickhill railway station in 1979. There were previously three other stations in the area, Partick Central railway station (renamed Kelvin Hall station in 1959), Merkland Street and Partick West railway station.

The Partick interchange was redeveloped in 2012 due to its immense potential as a top-class interchange not only between Rail, Bus and Subway but also as the main interchange station between the Argyle and North Clyde rail lines.

Religion

There is an old Quaker burial ground, the 'Quakers Graveyard', situated at the bottom of Keith Street. Now a visitors' attraction the graveyard was given over to the city of Glasgow. It was last used in 1857. Purdon Street, which runs parallel with Keith Street, was named after John Purdon, a prominent Quaker who lived in Partick in the 17th century. His wife is buried in the graveyard.

The local Church of Scotland congregation is served by Partick South Parish Church and Partick Trinity Church.

Partick's Catholic community is served by St Peter's church situated in Hyndland Street. St Simon's church, located in Bridge Street, was built in 1858 and is the third oldest Catholic church in Glasgow. An arson attack in 2021 left it a ruin with only the external walls remaining. The arsonist, Ryan Haggerty, was sentenced for five years and three months in October 2022.

Notable people
Charles Morton Aikman
Thomas Octavius Callender
Liz Cameron, Lord Provost of Glasgow
Stuart Christie
Billy Connolly, lived on White Street and Stewartville Street during his childhood and attended St Peter's Boys School.
Jane Gemmill, temperance activist
Rachel Hamilton
Helen Holm, golfer 
Jimmy Lawrence, footballer
Fred McDermid, politician
Garry McDowall, footballer
Pat McGinlay, footballer
Tosh McKinlay, footballer
Bud Neill, cartoonist

References

External links
 
 Partick Castle Article, Glasgow Evening Times.
 Partick - Origins and History
Partick: Glasgow's Girnal at Pat's Guide to Glasgow West End

 
Burghs
Areas of Glasgow